Marcus Trescothick is an English cricketer and former opening batsman for the England national cricket team. He has scored centuries (100 or more runs) on 14 occasions in Test cricket and 12 times in One Day International (ODI) matches.

Trescothick's first Test century was scored against Sri Lanka at Galle International Stadium in 2001, when he made 122. He then continued to score at least one century every year until his retirement from international cricket in 2006. His highest score of 219 was made against South Africa in 2003 at The Oval, London—his only double century. He has made a century in both innings of a Test match on only one occasion, against the West Indies in 2004 at Edgbaston. Despite being the first batsman to achieve this feat at Edgbaston, Trescothick was not named Man of the Match, as Andrew Flintoff's first-innings of 167 earned him the accolade instead. During the 2005 series against Bangladesh, Trescothick scored centuries in both Test matches against the touring side, helping earn him a Man of the Series award. His 14 Test centuries have been scored at 11 grounds; nine were scored in England and the remaining five were scored at different venues. Trescothick has been dismissed twice between 90 and 99, against India in 2001 and Australia in 2005.

Trescothick's 12 ODI hundreds remained a record for an English player until Joe Root went past his tally in July 2018. Trescothick passed Graham Gooch's (the previous record-holder) tally when he scored 100 not out against Bangladesh in his 100th ODI in 2005. This was also the fastest of his career, off 76 balls, the third fastest ODI century for an English batsman. Trescothick made his first ODI century against Pakistan, scoring a career-best 137. His century the following year against India in the final of the 2002 NatWest Series, along with two fifties earlier in the competition, saw him named Man of the Series. He was again named Man of the Series in the 2003 NatWest Challenge, finishing the three-match series with a century, a fifty and more than twice as many runs as any other player. Only six days later, captaining his side against South Africa, Trescothick scored another century and, alongside fellow opener Vikram Solanki, set an English record first wicket partnership of 200. His ODI hundreds have been made against 10 different opponents, on seven different grounds. Six of his centuries have been scored in London, equally split between The Oval and Lord's.

After scoring four Test centuries and two ODI centuries in 2004, Trescothick was named as one of the Wisden Cricketers of the Year in 2005. Between the two formats (Test and ODI), Trescothick has scored a century against every opponent he has played except Namibia and Netherlands, each of which he only faced in one ODI. Trescothick did not score a century in any of his three Twenty20 Internationals; his highest score was the 72 he scored against Sri Lanka in 2006.

Key
 * denotes that he remained not out.
  denotes that he was the captain of the English team in that match.
 Pos. denotes his position in the batting order.
 Test denotes the number of the Test match played in that series.
 Inn. denotes the number of innings in the match.
 H/A/N denotes whether the venue is home (England), away (opposition's home) or neutral.
 Lost denotes that the match was lost by England.
 Won denotes that the match was won by England.
 S/R denotes strike rate.

Test centuries

ODI centuries

References

External links
 Player Profile: Marcus Trescothick from Cricinfo
 Player Profile: Marcus Trescothick from CricketArchive

Trescothick
Trescothick, Marcus